William Orville "Wild Bill" Hickok III (August 23, 1874 – September 4, 1933) was an American football player and industrialist. Inevitably nicknamed "Wild Bill" for the folk hero of the American Old West, and also known as "Hickey," he starred at Yale University in track as well as football and was eventually inducted into the College Football Hall of Fame. After his athletic career, he became the president of his family's manufacturing business.

Early years
Hickok was born in Harrisburg, Pennsylvania, to William Orville Hickok, Jr., and Louisa Harrison Anderson Hickok. The family was prominent in Harrisburg civic life through his grandfather's machinery business, W.O. Hickok Manufacturing Company.

Yale University
Bill played guard at Yale and was twice selected as an All-American. In addition, he set records in the shot put and hammer throw for the track team.

Coaching career

Carlisle
After completing his studies, Hickok returned to Pennsylvania. In 1896 he was asked by another Yale graduate from Harrisburg, Vance McCormick, to coach the football team McCormick had organized at the nearby Carlisle Indian School. The team went 5-5 against a challenging schedule that included the leading Ivy League powers.

For the game against his alma mater, Hickok also served as a referee (a common practice at the time) along with an official provided by the Yale side. In a memorable moment, the Indians appeared to have scored a late touchdown to potentially tie the game when one of their players broke free with a handoff after the team's halfback had dived into the line. However, Hickok blew his whistle to call it back on the grounds that the play was dead prior to the handoff, causing his own team to protest. One newspaper covering the contest would compare his action to that of a corrupt Indian agent.

Hickok Manufacturing Company
Other than serving as an assistant coach at Yale, Hickok spent most of his remaining life in Harrisburg. He married Avis Cochran and eventually served as president of the Hickok Manufacturing Company. After his death in 1933, the position passed to his brother Ross.

Head coaching record

References
 Jenkins, Sally. The Real All Americans: The Team That Changed a Game, a People, a Nation. New York: Doubleday, 2007.
 Benjey, Tom. To correct the error copied from p. 55 of Jenkins that the 1896 record was 6-4 when it was actually 5-5. Jenkins appears to have accepted the erroneous score of the 1896 Carlisle-Brown game on p. 21 of Steckbeck.

External links
 
 Ross A. Hickok papers index — Pennsylvania State Archives
 

1874 births
1933 deaths
19th-century players of American football
American football guards
Carlisle Indians football coaches
Yale Bulldogs football players
All-American college football players
College Football Hall of Fame inductees
Sportspeople from Harrisburg, Pennsylvania
Coaches of American football from Pennsylvania
Players of American football from Harrisburg, Pennsylvania